Seokyeong University (SKU) is a private university in South Korea. The campus is located in 16-1 Jeongneung-dong, Seongbuk-gu, Seoul, South Korea.

History 
Seokyeong University was established in October 1947 as Hankook University which was the first 4-year evening school in Korea. It had difficulties during and after the Korean War, and in 1955 the school foundation was succeeded by Kookjae Hakwon; the university was renamed Kookjae University (lit. "International University"; not to be confused with present-day Kookje University in Pyeongtaek).

The university was succeeded by several foundations and in 1988 it moved to the present campus. In 1989 an independent and dedicated foundation was established for the university. In April 1992 the university was licensed as a full-fledged university, and in September 1992 it was renamed Seokyeong University. Since November 1998 the enrollment of the daytime students has been made larger than that of the evening students.

Colleges (undergraduate schools) 
 College of Humanities
 College of Social Science
 College of Natural Science & Engineering
 College of Arts

Graduate schools 
 Graduate School
 Graduate School of Business and Public Administration
 Graduate School of Logistics
 Graduate School of Education
 Graduate School of Social Science
 Graduate School of Beauty Arts

Research institutes 
 Institute of Liberal Arts
 Institute of Social Science
 Institute of Industry & Business Administration
 The Korean-Japanese Cultural Center
 Urban Research Center
 Institute of Unification Affairs
 Institute of Industrial Technology
 The Student Guidance Center
 Philosophical Thought Center
 Quality Academy
 Institute of Military Study

Notable alumni
 Han Sang-jin, actor
 Lee Jang-woo, actor
 Hana, singer and actress (Gugudan)
 Jang Ki-yong, actor and model
 Choi Young-jae, singer (Got7)

References

External links 
Official Website(Korean)
Official Website(English)

Universities and colleges in Seoul
Educational institutions established in 1947
1947 establishments in South Korea
Seongbuk District